Bethesda-Chevy Chase High School (B-CC) is a public high school in Montgomery County, Maryland. It is named for two of the towns it serves; it also serves Kensington and Silver Spring. It is located at 4301 East-West Highway, in Bethesda. In May 2012, Bethesda-Chevy Chase High School was ranked #6 in the state of Maryland, and #151 in the nation.

Bethesda-Chevy Chase is a part of Montgomery County Public Schools.

The school serves the Chevy Chase and Bethesda areas including the towns of Chevy Chase, Chevy Chase View, Chevy Chase Village, and Somerset; and the villages of Chevy Chase Section Three, Chevy Chase Section Five, Martin's Additions and North Chevy Chase. Schools within the Bethesda-Chevy Chase cluster include Westland Middle, Silver Creek Middle, Bethesda Elementary, Chevy Chase Elementary (3-5), North Chevy Chase Elementary (3-5), Rock Creek Forest Elementary, Rosemary Hills Elementary (Pre-K-2), Somerset Elementary, and Westbrook Elementary.  Former feeder schools include Leland Junior High School (7-9) and Rollingwood Elementary (K-6).

History 
New buildings or additions to existing buildings were constructed over the years:
 1936 –  added
 1950 –  added
 1952 –  added
 1959 –  added
 1966 –  added
 1970 –  added
 1975 –  added
 1976 –  added

In the summer of 1994, parents, teachers, administrators, business people and other supporters of B-CC High School formed the Community Coalition for Bethesda-Chevy Chase High School. Its charge was to re-engineer and refocus the high school in an increasingly urbanized and cosmopolitan area. CC-B-CC representatives were encouraged to think broadly and innovatively to create programs that would lead B-CC High School and Montgomery County Public Schools into the next century.

Because of this effort, in February 2002, B-CC High School re-opened its doors after a two-and-a-half year, multimillion-dollar, comprehensive modernization that, among other things, combined the historic 1935 and 1936 structures into one building. The building now encompasses .

In Fall 2018, B-CC opened a  addition with 34 new classrooms, a new dance studio, and more offices.

Facilities

The school has 80 classrooms, a media center with 30 computer workstations and TV studio and media production facilities, a greenhouse, a music laboratory and choral room, two gymnasiums and a weight training room, a 900-seat auditorium, and a cafeteria that serves breakfast and lunch. B-CC also has two "firsts" among Montgomery County Public Schools - a Cyber Café, opened in March 2003, and a Language Lab, installed in the summer of 2004.
In 2008, B-CC High School was equipped with 80 digital classroom Promethean boards.

Athletics

B-CC fields more than 25 athletic teams, known as the Battlin' Barons.

Fall sports
 Cheerleading (2nd place in the county '09, 1st place in the county '11, Varsity - Division 1)
 Cross country (girls') (2011 and 2012 Maryland 4A Girls' State Champions)
 Cross country (boys') (2007 Maryland 3A Boys' State Champions)
 Field hockey (State Champions 1988, 1990, 1992, 1994, 1995, 1996, 1997, 1998, 1999, 2000, 2001, 2002, and 2004; State Finalists 1987, 1989, 1991, 2003, 2006, 2007, 2011, and 2014)
 Football 
 Golf
 Poms (2008 and 2011 County Champions, 2013 Mid-Atlantic Champions, 2018 3rd place in county, 2019 2nd place in county)
 Rowing (boys') (club sport)
 Rowing (girls') (club sport)
 Soccer (boys') (State Champions 1980, 1982, 1984, 2001, 2007, 2017)
 Soccer (girls') (State Champions 2001, 2004, State 2008, 2009; 48 place in the Nation; State Champions 2010, 2011; State Finalists 2012)
 Sailing (club sport)
 Tennis (girls') (County Division 1 Champions '09)
 Volleyball (girls')
 Handball

Winter sports
Basketball (boys') (State Champions: 1959, 1984; Montgomery County Champions & MD State Finalist 1970)
Basketball (girls')
Bocce (2014, 2015, 2016 Division 4 Champions; 2014, 2015 Montgomery County Champions; 2013, 2015, 2016 Maryland State Champions)
Cheerleading
Ice hockey (club sport)
Indoor track (girls') (State Champions: 1980, 2008)
Indoor track (boys')
Poms
Swimming & diving
Wrestling

Spring sports
Baseball
Gymnastics (State Champions 2007–2010)
Lacrosse (boys')
Lacrosse (girls')
Outdoor track & field
Rowing (boys') (club sport) 
State Champions - 2009, 2010, 2011, 2012, 2013, 2014, 2015, 2016, 2017, 2019, 2022  
National finalists - 2000 (2nd), 2001 (1st), 2003, 2004 (3rd), 2005, 2009, 2010, 2011, 2012, 2016, 2017 (1st), 2018, 2019 (3rd), 2022 (1st)

Rowing (girls') (club sport) 
State Champions - 2009, 2010, 2012, 2013, 2014, 2015, 2016, 2017 
National finalists - 2002 (2nd), 2003, 2004 (1st), 2005, 2007 (3rd), 2008, 2012 (3rd), 2013, 2014, 2015 (1st), 2016, 2017, 2019 (3rd), 2018, 2022 
 Sailing (club sport) 
 National Fleet Race Championship - 2021 (4th)
Softball
Tennis (boys')
County Champions- 2015 
State Champions-2015 (Doubles) 
Volleyball (boys') 2015
Volleyball (coed)
Ultimate frisbee (club sport)
State champions - 2014, 2015, 2016

Activities
B-CC High School offers more than 80 clubs and student organizations.

Academic
B-CC High School has a state championship varsity physics team.

Notable staff 
Colman McCarthy, peace studies teacher

Notable alumni 
B-CC has had many notable alumni over the years in politics, business, academia, sports, and media.

Government and politics
 Andy Billig, Washington state senator from the 3rd District
 David Boren, U.S. Senator and Governor of Oklahoma; President of University of Oklahoma
 Chet Culver, Governor of Iowa, 2007-2011
 Howard A. Denis, Maryland State Senator, 1977–1994
 Daniel Dominguez, federal judge
 William Frick, member of the Maryland House of Delegates, 2007–2019
 L. Craig Johnstone, U.S. Ambassador to Algeria, and Deputy-High Commissioner for Refugees
 Peter Jo Messitte, federal judge
 Peter Navarro, Director of National Trade Council
 Neal Potter, county executive of Montgomery County, 1990–1994
 Ruy Teixeira, political scientist
 Roger W. Titus, federal judge
 Milan Dale Smith Jr. (born May 19, 1942) is an American attorney and jurist serving as a United States Circuit Judge of the United States Court of Appeals for the Ninth Circuit.

Business
 Jose Ferreira, CEO of Knewton
 Philip J. Kaplan (aka Pud), internet personality
 Frank Radice, media businessman, former President of National Academy of Television Arts & Sciences
 Jonathan I. Schwartz, CEO of Sun Microsystems

Academia
 Alfredo Jocelyn-Holt Letelier, Chilean historian
 John D. Hoffman, Manhattan Project chemist
 David Stuart, Mayanist scholar, youngest recipient of MacArthur Fellowship "genius grant"

Sports
 Mitchell Bobrow, karate fighter, 1969 All American Karate Grand Champion Madison Square Garden
 Moise Fokou, football player, linebacker for NFL's Tennessee Titans
 Frank Funk, MLB player (Cleveland Indians, Milwaukee Braves)
 Bill Guckeyson, 1937 NFL Draft; killed as a fighter pilot in World War II; namesake of the school's athletic field
 Collin Martin, Major League Soccer midfielder for D.C. United
 Elliana Pogrebinsky, figure skater
 Joe Urso, arena football player (Baltimore Blackbirds, Chesapeake Tide, Maryland Maniacs)
 Ethan White, Major League Soccer defender for D.C. United

Arts and entertainment
 Martin Blank, playwright, screenwriter, and producer
 Gaelan Connell, star of the movie Bandslam
 Tommy Davidson, comedian, cast member of TV series In Living Color
 John Duffey, Bluegrass Musician 
 Neal Fredericks, cinematographer, notably for The Blair Witch Project
 Robert Gordon, rockabilly singer
 Si Kahn, singer and songwriter
 Daniel Kessler, guitarist and founder of the band Interpol
 David Simon, creator and executive producer of HBO series The Wire
 Richard K. Spottswood, Musicologist and Actor
 Becky Stark, actress and lead singer of Lavender Diamond
 Daniel Stern, actor, appeared in two Home Alone movies
 Vicky Tiel, fashion designer
 Stefanie Zadravec, playwright

Media and journalism
 Rita Braver, TV broadcaster, CBS News correspondent
 John Harwood, Chief White House Correspondent for CNN
 Austin H. Kiplinger, journalist and philanthropist
 Charles Lane, columnist for The Washington Post''''; former editor of The New Republic magazine
 Andy Pollin, radio personality, sports talk station WTEM
 Peter Rosenberg, radio and TV personality, Hot 97
 Andy Serwer, journalist and former managing editor of Fortune magazine
 Carol Stuart Watson, illustrator and publisher, co-founder of The Georgetowner J.P. Finlay, Washington Football Team beat reporter, radio personality, sports talk station WJFK-FM

Books
 Tracy Chevalier, author of Girl with a Pearl Earring Joe Haldeman, science-fiction writer, author of The Forever War Laura Hillenbrand, author of Seabiscuit: An American Legend and Unbroken A.M. Homes, author of The End of Alice Michael Lowenthal, author of Avoidance Laurie Strongin, author of Saving Henry: A Mother's Journey Matthew Zapruder, poet, The Pajamaist''

References

External links

 

Educational institutions established in 1926
Public high schools in Montgomery County, Maryland
International Baccalaureate schools in Maryland
1926 establishments in Maryland
Schools in Bethesda, Maryland